Trebunie-Tutki is a folk musical group consisting of a family of musicians originating from Biały Dunajec village near Zakopane, Poland. Though there are many members of the extended family that play music, the core musicians currently are Krzysztof (violin & vocals) and Anna (basy & vocals).

They are known for their collaboration with the Jamaican reggae band Twinkle Brothers, in which the two groups combine traditional mountain music of the Polish górale with reggae.  Their joint record, Pieśni Chwały (Songs of Glory), went gold in Poland.

Discography
 Żywot Janicka Zbójnika ("Life of Janosik the Robber"), produced by Gamma, Kraków 1992
 Higher Heights (with Twinkle Brothers), prod. Twinkle Music, London 1992, prod. Kamahuk, Warszawa 1993
 Baciarujciez chłopcy, prod. Stebo, Kraków 1993
 Zagrojcie dudzicki, prod. Stebo, Kraków 1993
 Kolędy góralskie, prod. Folk, Zakopane 1993
 Ballada o śmierci Janosika ("Ballad on the Death of Janosik"), prod. Folk, Zakopane 1993
 Folk karnawał I, prod. Folk, Zakopane 1993
 Folk karnawał II, prod. Folk, Zakopane 1994
 Górale na wesoło, prod. Folk, Zakopane 1994
 Come Back Twinkle to Trebunia Family (with Twinkle Brothers, prod. Kamahuk, W-wa 1994
 Śpiewki i nuty, prod. Folk, Zakopane 1994
 Music of The Tatra Mountains - The Trebunia Family, prod. Nimbus Records, London 1995
 Saga, MC prod. Folk, Zakopane 1996
 Kolędy góralskie, ed. II, prod. Folk, Zakopane 1996
 Janosik w Sherwood, prod. Kamahuk, Warszawa 1996
 Greatest Hits, prod. Kamahuk, Warszawa 1997
 Góral-ska Apo-Calypso, prod. Folk, Zakopane 1998
 Podniesienie, prod. Kamahuk, Warszawa 1998
 Jubileusz z Warszawskim Chórem Międzyuczelnianym
 Etno-Techno, prod. Folk, Zakopane 2000
 Best Dub, prod. Kamahuk, Warszawa 2000
 Folk Karnawał, prod. Folk, Zakopane 2000
 Złota Kolekcja, prod. Pomaton EMI, Warszawa 2001
 Baciarujciez chłopcy, ed. II, prod. Folk, Zakopane 2001
 Zagrojcie dudzicki, ed. II, prod. Folk, Zakopane 2001
 Ballada o śmieci Janosika, ed. II, Folk, Zakopane 1993-2005
 Góralsko siła, F.F. FOLK, Zakopane, 2006
 Tischner - Trebunie-Tutki + Voo Voo-nootki, 2007
 Songs of Glory/Pieśni chwały - Tebunie-Tutki + Twinkle Brothers, Warszawa 2008

References

Polish folk groups